Maurer is residential neighbourhood and industrial district of Perth Amboy in Middlesex County, New Jersey, United States. Its name is derived from the "company town" built there in 1876. It is north of the  Route 440 approach to  the Outerbridge Crossing and south of the Perth Amboy Refinery, which began in 1920 as the Barber Asphalt Company. For a time it was known as Barber, a name which has fallen out of use 

The eastern area along the waterfront was active during World War II in building and decommissioning ships for the U.S. Navy. One of the primary ship builders during World War II was the New Jersey Shipbuilding Company. The community also housed the American Smelting and Refining Company.

See also
Neighborhoods in Perth Amboy, New Jersey
Amzi L. Barber

References

Neighborhoods in Perth Amboy, New Jersey
Company towns in New Jersey